United Nations Security Council resolution 1352, adopted unanimously on 1 June 2001, after recalling all previous resolutions on Iraq, including resolutions 986 (1995), 1284 (1999) and 1330 (2000) concerning the Oil-for-Food Programme, the Council extended provisions relating to the export of Iraqi petroleum or petroleum products in return for humanitarian aid until 3 July 2001.

The Security Council was convinced of the need for a temporary measure to provide humanitarian assistance to the Iraqi people until the Iraqi government fulfilled the provisions of Resolution 687 (1991) and had distributed aid throughout the country equally. It also recalled the 1996 memorandum of understanding between the United Nations and the Iraqi government.

Acting under Chapter VII of the United Nations Charter, the council extended the Oil-for-Food Programme and expressed its intention to consider new arrangements to improve the flow of commodities and products to Iraq (other than banned items) and the facilitation of civilian trade and economic co-operation with Iraq. The proposed arrangements would also improve measures to prevent the sale or supply of items prohibited by the council and revenue flows outside the escrow account established by the council.

Finally, the resolution declared that the new provisions would be adopted for 190 days beginning 4 July 2001.

See also
 Foreign relations of Iraq
 Gulf War
 Invasion of Kuwait
 Iraq sanctions
 List of United Nations Security Council Resolutions 1301 to 1400 (2000–2002)

References

External links
 
Text of the Resolution at undocs.org

 1352
2001 in Iraq
 1352
June 2001 events